Alejandro García Hernández (born July 18, 1979) is a Mexican professional boxer in the super welterweight (154 lb) division.

Nicknamed "Terra", Garcia turned pro in 2000, winning his first 22 fights, including the WBA Light Middleweight Title by beating Santiago Samaniego in 2003.  After a defense against former Olympian Rhoshii Wells, Garcia lost the belt to Travis Simms by 5th-round KO.  In 2005 he captured the interim WBA Light Middleweight Title by again beating Wells and defended it once before losing the belt to Jose Antonio Rivera in 2006.

Professional boxing record

See also 
List of light middleweight boxing champions
List of Mexican boxing world champions

References

External links 
 

1979 births
Light-middleweight boxers
Living people
Boxers from Baja California
Sportspeople from Tijuana
Welterweight boxers
World Boxing Association champions
Mexican male boxers
20th-century Mexican people
21st-century Mexican people